Josip Cindro (1760–1824) was a Dalmatian politician who was the Mayor of Split.

Sources
 

Mayors of Split, Croatia